Palmyra is a suburb of Perth, Western Australia, located within the City of Melville.

The suburb east of Fremantle appears to have been first established as the Palmyra Estate in 1903. 

The W.A. State Primary School the corner of what was then McKimmie Street (now McKimmie Road) between Zenobia and Aurelian Streets, was established in 1913. Its first Centenary was celebrated enthusiastically by students, residents and past pupils on Saturday 9 November 2013.
There is also a School associated with the Catholic Our Lady of Fatima Church at 8 Foss Street.
The St Peter and St Mark Anglican Church is a 2 Hammad Road. The Uniting Church is at the corner of Carrington Street and the Canning Highway.  The Seventh Day Adventist Church meets on Saturdays at 10 Cleopatra Street.

Palmyra includes the Fremantle Cemetery at its south-eastern suburb boundary, south of High Street/Leach Highway. Starting from its northern boundary, clockwise, Palmyra is bounded by the Canning Highway; by Stock Road on its East; by Sainsbury Road on its South; and in a dog-leg, by Carrington Street on its West, and Marmion Street on its South, and Petra Street on its West.

The Melville History Society meets at the Miller Bakehouse, corner of Elvira and Baal Streets, Palmyra.

There are a number of parks in Palmyra;

 King Victor's Green, between Hammad, Baal and Elvira Streets, where the Miller Bakehouse Museum is situated
 Emily Main Park, south of Palin Street, 
 Geo Thompson Park on McKimmie Road diagonally opposite Palmyra Primary School
 Woolshed Park, bounded by McGregor Road, from Goy Close to Baal Street
 Dark Park on the corner of Carrington Street and McGregor Road
 Dinosaur Park on the corner of Carrington and Aurelian Streets
 Three Bears Park on the corner of Adrian and Tamar Streets
 Public open space on the corner of Justinian and Solomon Streets
 Reddings Reserve, interrupting the course of Baal Street between Cleopatra and Solomon Streets
 Oz Park on the corner of Aurelian and Justinian Streets
 John O'Sullivan Park on the corner of Marmion and Baal Streets
 Bill Sheehy Park between Justinian Street, McGregor Road and Leach Highway,
 Lou Stonham Park bordering Stock Road, between McGregor Road and Forrest Street and the turn off from Leach Highway.

References

External links

Suburbs of Perth, Western Australia
Suburbs in the City of Melville